Metabolism: Clinical and Experimental is a monthly peer-reviewed medical journal covering all aspects of human metabolism. It was established in 1952 and is published by Elsevier. The editor-in-chief is Christos Socrates Mantzoros (Harvard Medical School) who has reinvigorated the journal during his tenure.

Abstracting and indexing
The journal is abstracted and indexed in
BIOSIS Previews
Current Contents/Life Sciences
Index Medicus/MEDLINE/PubMed
Science Citation Index
Scopus
According to the Journal Citation Reports, the journal has a 2021 impact factor of 13.93 and a current Cite Score (the equivalent of a 4 year impact factor) of 16.5 placing the journal in the top 3% of Endocrinology, Diabetes and Metabolism Journals.

References

External links

Publications established in 1952
Monthly journals
English-language journals
Elsevier academic journals
Endocrinology journals
Metabolism